Moundridge is a city in McPherson County, Kansas, United States.  As of the 2020 census, the population of the city was 1,974.  Manufacturing facilities for Grasshopper (lawn mowers) and Bradbury Group (roll forming equipment) are located in Moundridge.

History

Early history

For millennia, the Great Plains of North America were inhabited by nomadic Native Americans. From the 16th to the 18th century, the Kingdom of France claimed ownership of large parts of North America. In 1762, after the French and Indian War, France secretly ceded New France to Spain, under the terms of the Treaty of Fontainebleau.

19th century
In 1802, Spain returned most of the land to France, keeping title to about 7,500 square miles. In 1803, most of the land that comprises modern day Kansas was acquired by the United States from France as part of the 828,000 square mile Louisiana Purchase.

In 1854, the Kansas Territory was organized under the provisions of the Kansas–Nebraska Act, then in 1861 Kansas became the 34th US state. In 1867, McPherson County was established, which included the land for modern day Moundridge.

In 1876, the community was founded with the name Christian. In 1887, it was renamed and incorporated as Moundridge on account of the elevation of the town site.

Between 1874 and 1880, of the approximately 45,000 Mennonites who had been living in South Russia, 10,000 departed for the United States and 8,000 for Manitoba. Available cropland in the central United States was similar to that in their homelands in the Crimean Peninsula. Since the central part of the state was settled, Kansas has enjoyed the reputation as the top wheat-producing state. Settlers in central Kansas, experienced in Russian methods of dryland farming and flour milling, introduced winter wheat in 1873 and quickly saw their industry become dominant. The museums in nearby Hillsboro and Goessel demonstrate the lives and times of these early settlers.

Almost all of the original settlers of McPherson County spoke German, many exclusively. With the coming of the automobile and the importance of commercial participation with the English-speaking citizens, the use of German diminished in importance. The participation of the United States in World Wars I and II dramatically increased the use of English and by the early 1940s, ministers rarely preached in German. As of the year 2000, a very small number of German religious publications are available, primarily for use by elderly congregants.

Geography
Moundridge is located at  (38.202497, −97.518506).

Demographics

2010 census
As of the census of 2010, there were 1,737 people, 736 households, and 461 families residing in the city. The racial makeup of the city was 96.9% White, 0.3% African American, 0.4% Native American, 0.1% Asian, 0.9% from other races, and 1.3% from two or more races. Hispanic or Latino of any race comprised 3.4% of the population.

There were 736 households, of which 25.7% had children under the age of 18 living with them, 49.7% were married couples living together, 8.8% had a female householder with no husband present, 4.1% had a male householder with no wife present, and 37.4% were non-families; 33.6% of all households were made up of individuals, and 19.4% had someone living alone who was 65 years of age or older. The average household size was 2.25 and the average family size was 2.85.

The median age in the city was 46.6 years., with 21.6% of residents under the age of 18; 6% were between the ages of 18 and 24; 20% were from 25 to 44; 24.9% were from 45 to 64; and 27.6% were 65 years of age or older. The gender makeup of the city was 46.1% male and 53.9% female.

2000 census
As of the census of 2000, there were 1,593 people, 647 households, and 419 families residing in the city. The racial makeup of the city was 97.24% White, 0.50% African American, 0.88% Native American, 0.06% Asian, 0.75% from other races, and 0.56% from two or more races. Hispanic or Latino of any race comprised 1.51% of the population.

There were 647 households, out of which 28.7% had children under the age of 18 living with them, 58.0% were married couples living together, 4.9% had a female householder with no husband present, and 35.1% were non-families; 31.2% of all households were made up of individuals, and 17.2% had someone living alone who was 65 years of age or older. The average household size was 2.31 and the average family size was 2.90.

In the city, the population was spread out, with 22.5% under the age of 18, 6.6% from 18 to 24, 24.9% from 25 to 44, 19.6% from 45 to 64, and 26.4% who were 65 years of age or older. The median age was 42 years. For every 100 females, there were 87.9 males. For every 100 females age 18 and over, there were 85.4 males.

The median income for a household in the city was $37,644, and the median income for a family was $44,934. Males had a median income of $34,038 versus $20,223 for females. The per capita income for the city was $19,263. About 2.1% of families and 4.7% of the population were below the poverty line, including 5.0% of those under age 18 and 7.5% of those age 65 or over.

Economy
The Grasshopper Company manufactures mowers and lawn mower implements. It was founded in 1969 and headquartered in Moundridge.  The parent company is Moridge Manufacturing (founded in 1958).

Education
The community is served by Moundridge USD 423 public school district.

Infrastructure

Transportation
Interstate I-135 runs along the north-east side of the city. Highway US 81 passes through city.

Moundridge has a small airport, Moundridge Municipal Airfield, which is located approximately one mile (1.6 km) east of central Moundridge.

Notable people

 Laurie Koehn, professional basketball player

References

Further reading

 A Centennial Commemoration, Eden Mennonite Church, Moundridge, Kansas, Zur Ehre Gottes To the Glory of God 1895 - 1995; Eden Mennonite Church; 1998.
 Century One: History of Moundridge, Kansas, 1887-1987; Moundridge Centennial Committee; Mennonite Press; 1987.
 A Pictorial Review - Moundridge, Kansas 1887-1962; Moundridge Journal, 1962.
 Moundridge Golden Jubilee, 1887-1937; Moundridge Journal; Oct. 7, 1937.

External links

City
 
 Moundridge - Directory of Public Officials, League of Kansas Municipalities
Historical
 Moundridge history
 Eden Mennonite Church history
 Historic Images of Moundridge, Special Photo Collections at Wichita State University Library
Maps
 Moundridge city map, KDOT

Cities in Kansas
Cities in McPherson County, Kansas
German-Russian culture in Kansas
Mennonitism in Kansas
Populated places established in 1869
1869 establishments in Kansas
Russian Mennonite diaspora in the United States